Felipe Kitadai (born July 28, 1989) is a judoka from Brazil. He won a bronze medal at the 2012 Olympics and a gold at the 2011 Pan American Games. He also won gold medals six consecutive times in the Pan American Games Judo Championships: at 2011 Guadalaraja, 2012 Montreal, 2013 San José, 2014 Guayaquil, 2015 Edmonton and 2016 Havana.

Judo career
Kitadai was born in São Paulo, Brazil, and is a member of the athletic club Barueri in São Paulo and the club Sogipa.  He is coached on the Brazil national team by Luis Shinohara and Mario Tsutsui.

In 2009, Kitadai, who is Jewish, won a bronze medal in the 2009 Maccabiah Games in Tel Aviv, Israel, at U60, beating American Lindsey Durlacher along the way.  In 2010, he came in second in the Pan American Judo Championships in San Salvador, and won the World Cup Rome, both at U60.

In 2011, Kitadai won the Pan American Judo Championships in Guadalajara, the 5th International Military Sports Council (CISM) World Military Games Teams in Rio de Janeiro, and the Pan American Games in Guadalajara, all at U60. In 2012, he won the Pan American Judo Championships in Montreal at U60.

On July 28, 2012, his 23rd birthday, Kitadai won a bronze medal in the under 60 kg category at the London 2012 Olympic Games.  He won by beating Davaadorjiin Tömörkhüleg and Eisa Majrashi before losing to Rishod Sobirov.  Because Sobirov reached the semifinals, Kitadai was entered into the repechage.  In the repechage, he beat Choi Gwang-Hyeon and then Elio Verde to win the bronze medal.  He carried the medal everywhere.  On July 30, he damaged the ribbon and dented the medal when he dropped it in the shower. The IOC issued him a new medal at the request of the Brazilian Olympic Committee. The medal reportedly contains only $4.71 worth of metal.

In 2013, Kitadai won the Pan American Judo Championships in San Jose, and the World Military Championships in Astana, both at U60.

He participated at the 2016 Olympics, beating Walide Khyar and Tobias Englmaier before losing to Orkhan Safarov.  Because Safarov reached the semifinals, Kitadai was entered into the repechage where he lost to Diyorbek Urozboev in his first match.

See also
List of select Jewish judokas

References

External links

 
 
 
 
 2012 Olympics Athletes profile 

Brazilian people of Japanese descent
Judoka at the 2011 Pan American Games
Judoka at the 2012 Summer Olympics
Judoka at the 2016 Summer Olympics
Olympic judoka of Brazil
Olympic bronze medalists for Brazil
Living people
1989 births
Sportspeople from São Paulo
Olympic medalists in judo
Place of birth missing (living people)
Medalists at the 2012 Summer Olympics
Brazilian Jews
Jewish sportspeople
Jewish martial artists
Competitors at the 2009 Maccabiah Games
Maccabiah Games bronze medalists for Brazil
Brazilian male judoka
Pan American Games gold medalists for Brazil
Pan American Games silver medalists for Brazil
Pan American Games medalists in judo
Judoka at the 2015 Pan American Games
Maccabiah Games medalists in judo
Medalists at the 2011 Pan American Games
Medalists at the 2015 Pan American Games